Goodar is a rural locality in the Goondiwindi Region, Queensland, Australia.

Geography 
The locality is bounded  by the Barwon Highway to the south.

The Umbercollie State Forest is in the west of the locality.

The South Western railway line enters the locality from the south-east (Goondiwindi) and exits to the south-west (Toobeah).

The land use is a mixture of dry and irrigated crop growing along with grazing on native vegetation.

History 
The locality takes its name from a pastoral run held in the 1840s by James Marks, transferred to Edward G. Cory in August 1849.

The Goondiwindi-to-Talwood section of the  South Western railway opened on 4 May 1910 with the locality being served by two railway stations:

 Callandoon North railway station (now abandoned)

 Carbuckey railway station (now abandoned)

Education 
There are no schools in Goodar. The nearest primary schools are Goondiwindi State School in neighbouring Goondiwindi to the south-east, Lundavra State School in neighbouring Lundavra to the north-west and Kioma State School in Kioma to the west. The nearest secondary school is Goondiwindi State High School in Goondiwindi.

References 

Goondiwindi Region
Localities in Queensland